Avraham Zilberberg (born 15 December 1915, died 19 June 1980) was an Israeli politician who served as a member of the Knesset for the Alignment between 1969 and 1977.

Biography
Born in an area that later became Poland, Zilberberg spent World War II in Siberia. He made aliyah to Israel in 1948, and was one of the founders of Beit Elazari, the first moshav founded by new immigrants. He became one of the leaders of the Moshavim Movement, serving as its deputy general secretary, and was also chairman of the moshav constituent of the Labor Party.

In 1969 Zilberberg was elected to the Knesset on the Alignment list (an alliance of the Labor Party and Mapam). He was re-elected in 1973, but lost his seat in the 1977 elections.

He died in 1980 at the age of 64.

References

External links

1915 births
1980 deaths
Polish emigrants to Israel
Alignment (Israel) politicians
Members of the 7th Knesset (1969–1974)
Members of the 8th Knesset (1974–1977)